Paranoid Android is an open-source operating system for smartphones and tablet computers, based on the Android mobile platform. The latest official version is Topaz, based on Android 13, released on 15 October 2022.

In September 2015, PC Advisor called it the most famous ROM along with CyanogenMod, and The Economic Times called it the second-largest custom Android ROM in the world with over 200 000 users.

History
Paranoid Android was founded by Paul Henschel.

In February 2015, OnePlus hired a handful of key members from the Paranoid Android team to work on its new OxygenOS. This caused delays to the release of Paranoid Android 5.1 builds.

In October 2015, team member Matt Flaming told Android Authority that the project would go on hold. In June 2016, the Paranoid Android team announced that they were back with new team members. This announcement coincided with the release of a new version of Paranoid Android, which was based on Android 6.0.1 Marshmallow, with the May security patch, and included new customization features. On June 8, 2016, Paranoid Android supported Nexus 6P, Nexus 5X, Nexus 6, Nexus 5, Nexus 4, Nexus 7 2013, Nexus 9, OnePlus One, OnePlus 2, and OnePlus X.

On May 31, 2017, the team announced that they released the Nougat flavour of Paranoid Android. This version was based on Android 7.1.2 Nougat, with the most notable feature being the return of Pie Controls. Supported devices include the OnePlus 3 and 3T, Nexus 5X, Nexus 6P, Pixel, and Pixel XL.

On 12 May. 2018, the Paranoid Android Google+ account posted an update on the status of the project. The developers had run out of funds causing their website and Gerrit to shut down and ceasing all work on Oreo builds. The team stated that they were close to release but weren't able to continue without funds and looked to the community for donations.

On 27 August 2018, the Google+ page was updated with a new post titled "Being more transparent". The team apologized for a lack of communication and shared info about current activities. The team decided to finish device trees and release sources before discontinuing Oreo MR1. Basic builds were released for the OnePlus 3, 3T, 5 and 5T, as well as the Sony Xperia X, X Compact, XZ Premium, XZ1 and XZ2. The next goal was Android Pie, with the post saying builds were almost stable, though at the time of the post only two commits under the Pie branch were released on the team's Gerrit. They also released concept art for an upcoming feature named "Blink Navigation" based on gestures and Pie navigation, as well as a rundown of a new versioning system.

The project was relaunched with a new set of stable releases named "Quartz" (based on Android 10) on 16 April 2020, for a limited set of devices. The Quartz release coincides with supporting additional devices such as the Xiaomi Mi 9.

Features
According to The Economic Times, the two most notable features of Paranoid Android are the Halo and the Pie. The Halo (not included in version 5.0 or greater) is a floating bubble that lets users see notifications without leaving the current screen, and the Pie is a replacement for onscreen navigation buttons that stays off screen and lets users swipe in from the edge to see the buttons.

Paranoid Android also features Substratum theme support alongside their own Color Engine, accidental touch rejection, Pocket Lock (which prevents buttons being pressed in a user's pocket) and the ability to take a screenshot by swiping three fingers.

List of supported devices
The following is a list of devices that are supported by Paranoid Android:

See also
List of custom Android firmware

References

Notes
a.The commits to the Gerrit could previously be found at https://gerrit.aospa.co/#/q/project:AOSPA/android_device_qcom_common+branch:pie+until:2018-08-27, but have since been removed.

Further reading
Interview with Alex Naidis from AOSPA: The Future of Paranoid Android, Developer Advice and More!

External links
 

Custom Android firmware
Mobile operating systems
Free mobile software